No Lie may refer to:

 "No Lie" (2 Chainz song), 2012
 "No Lie" (Sean Paul song), 2016
 "No Lie", a 2020 song by Everglow from Reminiscence

See also 
 No Lies, a 1973 short film by Mitchell Block